Thales Electronic Systems GmbH, formerly Thales Defence & Security Systems GmbH, is a wholly owned subsidiary of Thales Group. Company holds a number of patents related to ion propulsion and produces a number of electronic components.

Company participated in 3 projects of the ARTES programme:

 AIN - developing aluminium nitride traveling-wave tube
 Q100W - for 100W Q-Band traveling-wave tube
 VHPS FO - developing light, very high power, 500W S band traveling-wave tube

Products
 HEMPT 3050

References

Thales Group divisions and subsidiaries
Companies based in Ditzingen